Eupithecia kuldschaensis is a moth in the  family Geometridae. It is found in Mongolia, China and south-east Kazakhstan. It has been found at an altitude between 1200 and 2000 meters, and is on wing in a single generation from mid-June to mid-July.

Both fore- and hindwings are a pale ochre tinged with some grey, with the hindwings slightly paler than the forewings. On both wings, the terminal area is darkened with a weak and wavy subterminal line, which is white on the forewing and whitish on the hindwing. The forewing's costal area is pale grey.

References

Moths described in 1892
kuldschaensis
Moths of Asia